This is a list of fictional characters in the television series FBI. The article deals with the series' main, recurring, and minor characters.

Main

Maggie Bell

Special Agent Maggie Bell is an FBI agent based at the New York City field office. In the pilot, it is established that she comes from Indiana and has been in New York City for three years. Maggie is a seasoned Investigator who is in charge of the team while out in the field. A former police officer, she was recommended to join the FBI after working with them on a kidnapping case back in Indiana. She is partnered with O.A., who joined the NYC field office after an undercover operation.

Maggie was happily married to reporter Jason Bell, who died in a car accident. Throughout season 1, she is seen secretly looking at photos and videos of Jason on her phone. She generally refused to talk about him to her colleagues, although O.A. seems to have known about her being a widow from the beginning. In the episode "Exposed", she finally confesses to O.A. that she has been having a hard time coping with Jason's death and has yet to clear out his closet. While investigating the murder of an investigative journalist in that episode, the team realize they are dealing with a professional assassin who has left a trail of bodies spanning several states and Maggie recognizes the man's face in a video she took of Jason, leading to her suspicions that the car accident Jason died in was engineered. She gets closure in the season 1 finale when she and her team apprehend the real perpetrator.

Omar Adom "O.A." Zidan

Special Agent Omar Adom "O.A." Zidan born some point in 1987 is an FBI agent based at the New York City field office. A native of New York City, he returned to his hometown after a stint undercover tracking down jihadist terrorists. He is a practicing Muslim and is of Egyptian heritage, having grown up in Astoria, Queens where there is a sizable Egyptian-American community. While he proudly identifies with his religion and heritage, he prefers to be called "American" rather than "Egyptian". He has a particular distaste for right-wing extremists, having seen his faith utilized for all the wrong reasons during his previous undercover assignment and endured bullying and Islamophobic remarks in school after the September 11 attacks.

O.A.'s encyclopedic knowledge of the Quran and fluency in speaking and reading Arabic has proven useful at times. According to Dana he is the NYC field office's only Arabic-speaking agent with undercover experience.

O.A. graduated from the United States Military Academy and left the Army with the rank of Captain. His military background has proven useful as he is familiar with various types of ballistics and firearms and their uses. He served on two tours in Iraq on Operation Iraqi Freedom.

Series creator Dick Wolf was initially casting a Latino for the ambiguously-named role of "O.A." but Zaki's audition tape impressed him enough to change the character to mirror Zaki's own ethnicity and background. Like the character, Zaki is a Muslim Egyptian-American who speaks Arabic and still has relatives in Egypt. Zaki has stated that Wolf and his writing team encouraged him to give input into his character to provide more authenticity.

Jubal Valentine

Assistant Special Agent in Charge (ASAC) Jubal Valentine is the second-in-command of the New York field office. He mostly coordinates the activities and movements of analysts and field agents from the Joint Operations Command (JOC) room in 26 Fed with many of the techs there either calling him by his first name or "Boss" and "Sir". Jubal usually stays behind at the field office to run operations, even briefing the team on their latest case while also giving information to the field agents and motivating the techs at the JOC to find information regarding a current case while also dispatching the field agents to locations concerning a potential lead via an earpiece he wears but he has been out in the field several times to assist with undercover stings. and operations while even participating in a raid and hostage negotiations. He trusts his agents implicitly and gives them the benefit of the doubt that they will rely on their training and good judgement.

Jubal's father worked for the United States Embassy in Moscow during the 1980s with Jubal living there from the ages of 12 to 14, presumably during 1986 to 1988. 

Jubal is also a recovering alcoholic but has been completely sober for years, often attending Alcoholic Anonymous meetings. As revealed in the FBI Season 3 episode, "Unreasonable Doubt", when his girlfriend at the time, Rina Trenholm told him she didn't want to be his mistress with Jubal also reluctant to tell his wife about her, the two broke up. This prompted Jubal to get wasted that night and ended with him blacking out. Upon awakening the next morning, Jubal discovered that he was in his car in his driveway, behind the wheel, unable to remember how he'd even gotten there. He also found a huge dent on the car along with a lot of blood. Due to the fact no hit and runs had been reported, he came to suspect that it had been an animal and this incident was what prompted him to begin AA meetings and presumably get sober. Jubal remained sober until the FBI Season 5 episode, "Breakdown" where following a medical crisis concerning his son, Tyler, he temporarily relapsed, drinking once again although he later stopped and began attending an A.A. meeting.

He has even assisted others in fighting their own addictions and currently serves as a sponsor to Morris Kalu. When Kalu was taken hostage while working as an undercover informant to stop drugs from hitting the streets of New York in the FBI Season 1 episode, "Conflict of Interest", Jubal saved Kalu's life by shooting dead Tayo, the man holding Kalu hostage.

He met Jess LaCroix, the agent in charge of the FBI Fugitive Task Force sometime in 2012, the two men working on the Haynes Spree Killer case with Jess helping Jubal with his alcoholic problems. When Jess's wife, Angelyne died in 2016, Jubal returned the help.

In 2014, while assigned to the FBI's Boston Field office, Jubal also worked on a case with Stuart Scola and the two reunited in September 2019 when Scola was transferred to the New York field office.

When Jubal and Trenholm reunited in Spring 2021 during a case concerning drug cartel boss Antonio Vargas, they secretly began a relationship once the case had ended with the relationship continuing up until her death in January 2022 with it being revealed that Vargas had arranged for Trenholm's death in revenge for the murders of his own wife and young son who were killed and hung on a bridge in Mexico.

Like the main field agents assigned to the FBI New York field office, Jubal carries a Glock 19 as his main sidearm but unlike all the other agents and techs seen at the JOC, Jubal keeps his weapon on him at all times in a holster located on his right hip, presumably due to the fact that he could be sent out into the field from the JOC at any given moment.

Jubal is divorced but he and his ex-wife Samantha are on friendly terms and share custody of their two children, Tyler and Abigail although she has physical custody of them. As part of their divorce agreement, she cannot move the children without his consent. This posed a conundrum for him when her new boyfriend got a job in Westchester County and she came to him asking for his consent to move the children out of New York City to the suburbs. He finally agrees after going to check out the new house and neighborhood for himself.

Kristen Chazal

Kristen Chazal is an FBI technical analyst and later field agent based at the FBI field office in New York City.

In FBI Season 1, she serves as a technical analyst, often reporting her findings to the field agents and Special Agents in Charge Ellen Solberg, Dana Mosier and Isobel Castille as well as Assistant Special Agent in Charge Jubal Valentine although midway through the season, she confides in FBI agent Maggie Bell that she wishes to become a field agent.

In FBI Season 2, Kristen becomes a field agent with her new partner being FBI Special Agent Stuart Scola although she usually returns to the Joint Operations Command or JOC to search for information on the team's latest case but in the episode, "Ties That Bind", Kristen finds her confidence being shaken when she makes a mistake during field training which results in Scola being shot with a paintball, an incident that has the instructor berating her over. Near the end of the episode, Kristen joins the team in attempting to arrest Jordan Cameron but is left badly injured when Jordan stabs her in the throat, Maggie tending to her while Jordan is shot dead by Scola and OA.

As Kristen in treated in "Fallout", she is temporarily replaced by agent Emily Ryder and even though Kristen makes a full recovery, ultimately being discharged in "Hard Decisions" while expressing her intent to return to the field, this has her teammates doubtful.

Eventually, during "Legacy", Jubal allows Kristen to return to the field and she helps her colleagues arrest the men of terrorist Sulaiman Mansor while OA personally shoots Mansor dead, Mansor having disguised himself as a military police officer and secretly infiltrated West Point so that he could murder General Carson, the man responsible for signing off on the strike that killed Mansor's family.

In the FBI Season 3 premiere episode, "Never Trust a Stranger", a conversation between Jubal and Castille reveals that Jubal received a text from Kristen, informing him she had moved to Dallas, Texas and subsequently joined the FBI field office there with former NYPD officer Tiffany Wallace later permanently replacing Kristen as Scola's partner.

Ellen Solberg

Ellen Solberg is the Special Agent in Charge of the FBI New York field office.

Appearing only in the FBI Season 1 series premiere episode, "Pilot", she oversees the investigation into the blast that destroyed an apartment building in downtown New York and although the investigation lasts for two days, her field agents successfully apprehend Robert Lawrence, a white supremacist responsible for the attack. 

Due to her actress, Connie Nielsen being unable to commit the series after the pilot episode, Solberg was written out of the series and replaced by Dana Mosier (Sela Ward) while following Mosier's retirement, she was replaced by Isobel Castille (Alana De La Garza).

Dana Mosier

Dana Mosier is a Special Agent in Charge of the FBI New York field office.

Prior to joining the New York field office, she was with the FBI's Behavioral Analysis Unit where she profiled serial killers, a skill she often uses during her time as SAC at the New York field office to give herself and the team an insight into the psychological mindset of a criminal.

Isobel Castille

Isobel Castille is the current Special Agent in Charge of the FBI New York Field office, having been promoted to the position sometime after the retirement of her predecessor, Dana Mosier.

Previously an Assistant Special Agent in Charge and a Supervisor of the Fugitive Squad, she also attended and graduated from West Point while even working a brief stint in Silicon Valley.

Stuart Scola

Stuart Scola is a Special Agent assigned to the FBI's New York Field office and also the current field partner of fellow FBI agent Tiffany Wallace.

A graduate of Princeton, Scola worked as a stockbroker at Goldman Sachs for seven years before leaving as according to him, he wanted a more real and deep meaningful life which he revealed during "Outsider". Due to his prior career, he has an insight into how the stock markets operate and even helped solve a case thanks to his knowledge of the genetic chimera phenomenon which came in handy during the FBI Season 3 episode, "Unreasonable Doubt".

He later joined the FBI and during his time working at the FBI Boston Field office, met Jubal Valentine, the two working on a case together. 

He has a younger sister named Alexandra while his older brother, Doug Scola died in 9/11.

During the FBI Season 2/FBI: Most Wanted Season 2 crossover episode, "American Dreams", Scola is revealed to known Special Agent Sheryll Barnes, a member of the FBI's Fugitive Task Force from their time at Quantico with Barnes even revealing Scola slept with her roommate, Nicole, a comment that has Scola neither confirming nor denying it happened.

Tiffany Wallace

Tiffany Wallace is an FBI Special Agent assigned to the New York Field Office.

Raised in Bed Stuy or Bedford–Stuyvesant, Brooklyn, she spent six years with the New York Police Department, specifically Narcotics and fell in love with becoming a federal agent while working on a joint task force.

Upon becoming an FBI agent, she spent two years in Atlanta before transferring to New York.

Minor characters

Recurring
 Derek Hedlund as Special Agent JT, an FBI agent frequently working in the field with OA and Maggie
 James Chen as Ian Lim, an FBI analyst who works mostly in the JOC- Joint Operations Command under Assistant Special Agent in Charge Jubal Valentine. In addition to working in the JOC, he has been in the field many times, assisting Jubal and field agents Maggie Bell and Omar Adom "OA" Zidan.
 Thomas Phillip O'Neil as Dr. Neil Mosbach, FBI Medical Examiner.
 Rodney Richardson as Ray Stapleton, an FBI forensic technician (season 1).
 Nina Lisandrello as Eve Nettles, an FBI forensic technician (season 1).
 Taylor Anthony Miller as Kelly Moran, an FBI analyst (season 2). Like his fellow FBI analysts, Ian Lim and Elise Taylor, he regularly assists in search for information concerning the team's newest case. 
 Roshawn Franklin as Trevor Hobbs, an FBI intelligence analyst (season 2).
 Vedette Lim as Elise Taylor, an FBI intelligence analyst (season 2). Like FBI intelligence analysts Ian Lim and Kelly Moran, she too helps the FBI field team search for information regarding the latest case they're investigating. In the FBI Season 3 episode, "Liar's Poker", she is abducted off-screen at gunpoint and later sent to 26 Fed with a bomb collar around her neck which only stops at six seconds due to Special Agent in Charge Isabelle Castille deciding to have drug cartel leader Antonio Vargas released from FBI custody. Despite Elise surviving, she later becomes psychologically scarred as a result and begins developing an addiction to anti-anxiety meds, something that FBI agent Maggie Bell later confronts her over with Maggie urging Elise to go to Assistant Special Agent in Charge Jubal Valentine who himself has had problems with addiction during the FBI Season 3 episode, "Trigger Effect". In the FBI Season 3 finale episode, "Straight Flush", Elise reveals that she has been transferred to the White Collar division of the FBI but by the time the FBI Season 4 premiere episode, "All That Glitters" has aired, she is shown back at the JOC- Joint Operations Command once again under Jubal's command, Jubal informing her that he's glad she's back much to Elise's own relief with Kelly Moran even smiling as well, implying Elise might have taken Maggie's advice and sought counselling for her addiction.
 Catherine Haena Kim as Emily Ryder, an FBI agent who temporarily fills in for Kristen when she is injured in the line of duty (season 2).

Crossover characters
 Julian McMahon as Jess LaCroix, FBI Supervisory Special Agent (FBI: Most Wanted)
 Keisha Castle-Hughes as Hana Gibson, FBI Analyst (FBI: Most Wanted)
 Kellan Lutz as Ken Crosby, FBI Special Agent (FBI: Most Wanted)
 Roxy Sternberg as Sheryll Barnes, FBI Special Agent And Second In Command (FBI: Most Wanted)
 Nathaniel Arcand as Clinton Skye (season 1), FBI Special Agent (FBI: Most Wanted)
 YaYa Gosselin as Tali Lacroix, daughter of Jess LaCroix (FBI: Most Wanted)
 Tracy Spiridakos as Detective Hailey Upton (season 2), A member of the Intelligence Unit for the Chicago Police Department (Chicago P.D.) who temporarily joins the NY field office for an interagency training program. She is OA's partner while she is on the show due to Peregrym's maternity leave in season 2.

References

FBI (TV series)
FBI